The South Metropolitan Electric Light and Power Company Limited was a British electricity undertaking. It was established in 1904 upon the amalgamation of two south London companies which had supplied electricity in south east London since 1893. It owned and operated a power station at Blackwell Point and one at Penge. From 1925 it formed an association with three other London companies, with the intention of centralising electricity generation in the new, high thermal efficiency, power station at Barking. The South Metropolitan Company was abolished in March 1948 upon the nationalisation of the British electricity supply industry.

Background 
The South Metropolitan Electric Light and Power Company Limited took over the interests of several early south London electricity supply companies.

The Electric Construction and Maintenance Company was registered on 30 June 1883. The name was changed to the Electric Installation and Maintenance Company on 2 December 1889, and then to the Crystal Palace District Electric Supply Company on 19 December 1891. A Provisional Order to supply electricity was granted by the Board of Trade in 1890. The Crystal Palace District Company supplied electricity to parts of the districts Camberwell, Lambeth, Lewisham, Croydon, Beckenham and Penge from February 1893.

The Blackheath and Greenwich District Electric Light Company Limited was registered on 11 May 1896. A Provisional Order was granted by the Board of Trade in 1897 to supply electricity to Greenwich, Charlton, Eltham, Lee, Kidbrook, and Lewisham. The local authorities had the right to purchase the part of the undertaking within its district at a premium of 33 per cent above the capital expended. Electricity supplies started from Blackwall Point power station in 1900.

On 16 June 1904 the Crystal Palace District undertaking was taken over by the Blackheath and Greenwich District Electric Light Company Limited. Following the take-over the combined undertaking was known as the South Metropolitan Electric Light and Power Company Limited. The Company’s  supply area comprised the Metropolitan Boroughs of Lewisham and Greenwich except the parish of St Nicholas Deptford, the Urban District of Penge, a small part of the south of the Metropolitan Borough of Lambeth, and a small part of the south of the Metropolitan Borough of Camberwell. The Company was authorised to supply current to small areas in the Croydon County Borough and the Beckenham and Penge Urban Districts.

Operations

Management Board 
The management board of the South Metropolitan Company in 1909 comprised:

 Henry St John Winkworth (Chairman)
 William May
 Henry White Bowden (Managing Director)

The company offices were at 183-185 High Street Lewisham.

In 1936–38 the board was composed of:

 Sir Bernard Greenwell (Chairman)
 M. B. U. Dewar
 Sir Robert Renwick

The company offices were at County House, 46/47 New Broad Street, London EC2.

Power stations 
The Crystal Palace District generating works was known as the Springfield Works, and was located in Springfield Road, Sydenham. The works were opened in 1893 and closed about 1904–10.

Penge power station also supplied electricity to the South Metropolitan Company system.

The Blackheath and Greenwich Company build a power station at Blackwall Point on the site of the East Greenwich tide mill. It opened in February 1900.

In 1923 the plant at Blackwall Point comprised:

 Boilers:
 Coal fired boilers producing 371,000 lb/h (46.7 kg/s/) of steam which supplied:
 Generators:
 2 × 1,500 kW turbo-alternator, alternating current,
 1 × 2,500 kW turbo-alternator, alternating current, 
 3 × 5,000 kW turbo-alternator, alternating current, 

These machines had a total generating capacity of 20,000 kW.

The electricity available to customers was:

 2-phase AC 50 Hz, or 3-phase AC 50 Hz, at 400, 200 and 100 Volts.

Operational data 
The amount of electricity load for the Crystal Palace District undertaking was as follows:

The amount of electricity and number of customers of the Blackheath and Greenwich District operations 1900–03 was as follows.

Both data tables demonstrate the rapid increase in electricity demand for electricity during this period. Comparative data for the Blackheath and Crystal Palace undertakings in 1903 was as follows.

The data demonstrates that the Crystal Palace undertaking was about half the size of the Blackheath and Greenwich undertaking.

Electricity supply 
The business of the South Metropolitan Company increased to meet the rising demand for electricity. The following table summarises the growth of the Company in terms of capacity of the plant, the electricity load, the amount of current sold, and the number of customers.

The growth in sales of electricity in MWh is shown on the following graphs. From 1903 the South Metropolitan Company was authorised to supply electricity in bulk to the West Kent Electric Company; in 1923 the South Metropolitan supplied the Kent Company 5,323 MWh.

Electricity use 
Electricity was originally used for lighting but ‘power’ uses were soon established. The following table illustrates the changing patterns of use.

Financial statistics 
The capital required to establish, build and operate the business was raised through the offer of shares. Capital expenditure was needed for the purchase of land, buildings, machinery, mains, transformers, meters, electrical instruments, legal costs, fixtures and furniture at the stations. The capital expenditure for the Crystal Palace Company in 1896 was £75,770  1s  9d, and in 1897 was £7,965  15s 1d.

The Blackheath and Greenwich, and South Metropolitan (from 1904) Company current account revenue was as follows.

Share offers were made on several occasions throughout the operating life of the company. For example, in 1909 an issue of 50,000 six per cent shares at £1 were offered. In 1938 an issue of £500,000 3½ per cent debenture stock and 500,000 4 per cent £1 shares were offered.

The overall revenue, expenses and profit for the South Metropolitan Company were as shown.

To meet the requirement of increased demand, capital expenditure on new plant and equipment was required, as shown on the table below.

Dividends to shareholders were paid throughout the operational life of the company. Dividends as a percentage of the total capital raised in a given year were as shown, together with the average dividends paid by the London company electricity undertakings.

Company profits in the mid-1930s were: £114,325 (1935); £119,762 (1936); and £149,933 (1937).

Joint working 
The South Metropolitan Company and three other companies in south and east London promoted the London Electricity (No.1) Act 1925. The four companies were: the City of London Electric Lighting Company; the County of London Electric Supply Company Limited; the South London Electric Supply Corporation Limited; and the South Metropolitan Electric Light and Power Company Limited. They established a joint committee to specify how generating stations of each company were operated. The companies remained district electricity supply undertakings; although they were physically joined with interconnecting cables. The companies envisaged that power stations such as Barking would provide enough capacity for their electricity requirements. The Act required equal consideration for the interests of shareholders and consumers. Dividends to shareholders were limited to 7 percent per year and the funds that could be carried forward in the accounts were restricted. Profits above these conditions formed a ‘consumers’ benefit’ in the form of lower prices.

The County of London Company built the 118.75 MW Barking A power station which was commissioned in 1925. This was followed by the 303.5 MW Barking B commissioned from 1933.

These interconnections and those provided by the national grid enabled the bulk transfer of electricity. In 1931 the South Metropolitan Company generated 35,157 MWh and purchased 30,216 MWh.

Government policy 
Under the terms of the Electricity (Supply) Act 1926 (16-17 Geo. 5 c. 51) the Central Electricity Board (CEB) was established. The CEB identified high efficiency ‘selected’ power stations that would supply electricity most effectively. The CEB also constructed the national grid (1927–33) to connect power stations within a region.

The British electricity supply industry was nationalised in 1948 under the provisions of the Electricity Act 1947 (10-11 Geo. 6 c. 54). The South Metropolitan Electric Light and Power Company Limited undertaking was abolished, ownership of Blackwall Point and Penge power stations were vested in the British Electricity Authority, and subsequently the Central Electricity Authority and the Central Electricity Generating Board (CEGB). At the same time the electricity distribution and sales responsibilities of the South Metropolitan electricity undertaking were transferred to the London Electricity Board (LEB).

Blackwall Point power station was operational until 1948, when the British Electricity Authority rebuilt it as a 100 MW station. Barking A and B power stations were operational until 1969 and 1976 respectively.

See also 

 Timeline of the UK electricity supply industry
 London Power Company
 Charing Cross and Strand Electricity Supply Corporation
 City of London Electric Lighting Company
 County of London Electric Supply Company
 South London Electric Supply Corporation

References 

Defunct electric power companies of the United Kingdom
Electric power companies of England
Electric power infrastructure in England
Energy companies disestablished in 1948
British companies disestablished in 1948